Weekend in Paradise may refer to:

 Weekend in Paradise (1931 film), a German musical comedy film
 Weekend in Paradise (1952 film), a West German comedy film